Wasil may refer to:

Wasil (Sufism), a rank in Sufism

People
Wasil ibn Ata, a Muslim theologian and jurist
Wasil Ahmad, Afghan child soldier
Stephen Wasil, American Arena football quarterback

See also
Wassail, a beverage of hot mulled cider associated with Christmas